Frank Deal (born October 7, 1958) is an American actor known for his roles in film, tv, and theatre.  In addition to acting and directing, Deal taught theatre at The Juilliard School, Yale School of Drama, and New York University's, Tisch School of the Arts.  Film credits include,  The Amazing Spiderman 2, Non-Stop, and Eighth Grade, among others.  TV credits include recurring roles on Manifest, Gypsy, The Americans, and Law & Order: Special Victims Unit. Broadway credits include the original production of Tracy Letts, August: Osage County.  B.A. Duke. M.F.A. NYU's Tisch School of the Arts.

Filmography

Film

Television

References 

1958 births
Living people
Actors from Birmingham, Alabama
Actors from Alabama
Place of birth missing (living people)